Kevin Michael Padlo (born July 15, 1996) is an American professional baseball third baseman in the Los Angeles Angels organization.  The Colorado Rockies selected Padlo in the fifth round of the 2014 Major League Baseball draft. He made his MLB debut in 2021. He previously played for the Tampa Bay Rays, Seattle Mariners, San Francisco Giants and Pittsburgh Pirates.

Career

Colorado Rockies
Padlo attended Murrieta Valley High School in Murrieta, California, where in addition to playing baseball he was a two-time all-league basketball selection. He committed to attend the University of San Diego on a college baseball scholarship.

The Colorado Rockies selected Padlo in the fifth round of the 2014 Major League Baseball draft. Rather than enroll in college, Padlo signed with the Rockies, receiving a $650,000 signing bonus.

Padlo made his professional debut with the Grand Junction Rockies of the Rookie-level Pioneer League, batting .300/.421/.594 with eight home runs and 44 RBIs in 48 games. To start 2015, the Rockies assigned Padlo to the Asheville Tourists of the Class A South Atlantic League. He struggled, and was demoted to the Boise Hawks of the Class A-Short Season Northwest League.

Padlo spent the entire 2015 season with the Hawks, and was named a preseason and midseason Northwest League All-Star. In 27 games for Asheville he batted .145, and in 70 games for Boise he hit .294/.404/.502 with nine home runs and 46 RBIs.

Tampa Bay Rays

On January 28, 2016, the Rockies traded Padlo and Corey Dickerson to the Tampa Bay Rays in exchange for Jake McGee and Germán Márquez. He spent the 2016 season with the Bowling Green Hot Rods of the Class A Midwest League, where he batted 	.230/.358/.413 with 16 home runs and 66 RBIs in 115 games. He spent 2017 with the Charlotte Stone Crabs of the Class A-Advanced Florida State League, posting a .223 batting average with six home runs and 34 RBIs in 64 games. After the season, the Rays assigned Padlo to the Surprise Saguaros of the Arizona Fall League.

Padlo returned to Charlotte in 2018, batting .223 with eight home runs and 54 RBIs with 115 games. He split the 2019 season between the Montgomery Biscuits and Durham Bulls, hitting a combined .265/.389/.538/.927 with 21 home runs and 62 RBI.

Padlo was added to the Rays 40–man roster following the 2019 season. He did not play a minor league game in 2020 due to the cancellation of the minor league season caused by the COVID-19 pandemic.

On April 6, 2021, Padlo was promoted to the major leagues for the first time to fill in for the injured Kevin Kiermaier. He made his MLB debut that night as the starting third baseman against the Boston Red Sox.
After batting .083 over 12 at-bats, Padlo was designated for assignment by the Rays.

Seattle Mariners
On August 19, 2021, Padlo was claimed off of waivers by the Seattle Mariners. He was assigned to the Triple-A Tacoma Rainers, for whom he batted .298/.388/.596.

Padlo was assigned to Triple-A Tacoma to begin the 2022 season. After limping to a .173/.317/.327 batting line with Tacoma, he was designated for assignment on April 23, 2022, when the Mariners acquired Stuart Fairchild.

San Francisco Giants
On April 26, 2022, the Mariners traded Padlo to the San Francisco Giants in exchange for cash considerations. He joined the Triple-A Sacramento River Cats, and hit three home runs in a game on May 1. The Giants promoted Padlo to the major leagues on May 3. He batted 2-for-12 for the Giants in 2022. On June 9, Padlo was designated for assignment by San Francisco after the team acquired Austin Wynns.

Seattle Mariners (second stint)
Padlo was claimed back by the Seattle Mariners off waivers on June 11, 2022. On August 5, 2022, Padlo was designated for assignment.

Pittsburgh Pirates
On August 7, 2022, Padlo was claimed off waivers by the Pittsburgh Pirates. On August 27, Padlo was designated for assignment. He elected free agency on November 10, 2022.

Los Angeles Angels
On December 25, 2022, Padlo signed a minor league deal with the Los Angeles Angels.

References

External links

Living people
1996 births
People from Murrieta, California
Baseball players from California
Major League Baseball third basemen
Tampa Bay Rays players
Seattle Mariners players
San Francisco Giants players
Pittsburgh Pirates players
Grand Junction Rockies players
Asheville Tourists players
Boise Hawks players
Bowling Green Hot Rods players
Charlotte Stone Crabs players
Surprise Saguaros players
Montgomery Biscuits players
Durham Bulls players
Tacoma Rainiers players
Sacramento River Cats players
Brisbane Bandits players
American expatriate baseball players in Australia